Hyalurga is a genus of tiger moths in the family Erebidae. The genus was erected by Jacob Hübner in 1819.

Species

Hyalurga albovitrea Walker, [1865]
Hyalurga batesi (Druce, 1893)
Hyalurga caralis Druce, 1885
Hyalurga chariata (Druce, 1893)
Hyalurga choma (Druce, 1893)
Hyalurga chthonophyle (Druce, 1885)
Hyalurga cinctella Strand, 1911
Hyalurga clara (Butler, 1873)
Hyalurga discozellularis Strand, 1921
Hyalurga dorsilinea Hering, 1925
Hyalurga fenestra (Linnaeus, 1758)
Hyalurga fenestrata (Walker, 1855)
Hyalurga grandis Druce, 1911
Hyalurga halizoa (Druce, 1907)
Hyalurga hoppi Hering, 1925
Hyalurga lauronoides Hering, 1925
Hyalurga leucophaea (Walker, 1854)
Hyalurga leucophlebia Hering, 1925
Hyalurga melania Hering, 1925
Hyalurga modesta Möschler, 1878
Hyalurga mysis (Erichson, 1848)
Hyalurga noguei Dognin, 1891
Hyalurga orthotaenia Hering, 1925
Hyalurga osiba (Druce, 1893)
Hyalurga padua (Druce, 1893)
Hyalurga partita (Walker, 1854)
Hyalurga peritta Hering, 1925
Hyalurga pura Butler, 1876
Hyalurga putumayana Hering, 1925
Hyalurga rica (Hübner, [1831])
Hyalurga rufilinea (Walker, [1865])
Hyalurga scotina Hering, 1925
Hyalurga sixola Schaus, 1910
Hyalurga sora (Boisduval, 1870)
Hyalurga subafflicta (Walker, [1865])
Hyalurga subnormalis Dyar, 1914
Hyalurga supposita Hering, 1925
Hyalurga syma (Walker, 1854)
Hyalurga uria Butler, 1871
Hyalurga urioides Schaus, 1910
Hyalurga vinosa (Drury, [1773])
Hyalurga whiteleyi Druce, 1911
Hyalurga zetila (Boisduval, 1870)

References

 
Pericopina
Moth genera